Jason Ablewhite is the former Police and Crime Commissioner for Cambridgeshire (PCC), representing the Conservative Party. He is also a former Huntingdonshire district councillor for St Ives. He was elected to the PCC post in the 2016 election, succeeding the previous incumbent, Graham Bright. Ablewhite was elected as a Conservative councillor in St Ives in 2005, and was Conservative leader of the district council for five years, before standing down in 2015 to take up the role of PCC.

On 11 November 2019 he resigned as Police and Crime Commissioner following his referral to the Independent Office for Police Conduct after a complaint from a member of the public alleging that Ablewhite had sent her unsolicited indecent photographs of himself via social media. He was succeeded by his deputy, Ray Bisby

Following on from this a police investigation was believed to have found rounds of live ammunition in his property.

References

Living people
Police and crime commissioners in England
Conservative Party police and crime commissioners
Conservative Party (UK) councillors
Councillors in Cambridgeshire
1972 births
Leaders of local authorities of England